William Joseph Murnane (March 22, 1945 – November 17, 2000) was an American Egyptologist and author of a number of books and monographs on Ancient Egypt. He was director of the Great Hypostyle Hall Project at Luxor Karnak Temple, was a research associate and held a Dunavant Professorship in the History Department of the Institute of Egyptian Art & Archaeology at the University of Memphis. Several of his scholarly monographs  are used as standard references by historians and philologists whilst more popular works, which drew on his considerable knowledge of Ancient Egyptian monuments, are used by tourists.

Life and work
Murnane was born in White Plains, New York, in 1945 but at 18 months old  moved with his parents to in Venezuela, where he was raised.  On returning to the United States at 13 he  attended Saint Anselm College in New Hampshire, where he showed an early interest in Egyptian hieroglyphs and wrote letters to his sister using the ancient language. He supplemented his income by teaching Spanish and graduated in 1966.

In 1972  he joined the staff of the Epigraphic Survey at Chicago House in Luxor, Egypt, and gained  his doctorate (with honours) from the University of Chicago the following year with his thesis Ancient Egyptian Coregencies. His epigraphic work included documenting the texts and depictions from  major temples in Karnak, Khonsu, and Luxor as well as from the small temple at  Medinet Habu.  Along with Charles van Siclen, he located and copied the texts at Akhenaten's capital city and published them in 1993 as The Boundary Stelae of Akhenaten.  He also contributed translations and commentaries for folio editions publications produced by the Oriental Institute.

He remained at Luxor until 1986, when he was appointed Visiting Associate Professor of Egyptology at the University of California, Berkeley. The following year  he was employed by Memphis State University (later called University of Memphis) in their history department and was appointed full professor in 1994. He was on  the editorial boards of several journals, including JARCE,  JEA and KMT.  He was also a member of the boards of the National Endowment for the Humanities and the Michela Schiff Giorgini Foundation for the review of grants. ". He was the director of the Karnak Great Hypostyle Hall Project for over twenty years, seeking  to document all the texts and depictions on one  of the most frequently visited monuments before they vanished.

Murnane won numerous awards and prestigious grants during his career. He was awarded the Distinguished Research Award of the College of Arts and Sciences in 1994. He was presented with: the Eminent Faculty Research Award (the University of Memphis’ highest distinction) and was the winner of three University faculty  research awards.

He has been described as “the ideal colleague, a real "gentleman scholar"”.  In 2009 a volume of essays by scholars to honour the memory William Murnane was published "Causing His Name to Live: Studies in Egyptian Epigraphy and History in Memory of William J. Murnane".

Select bibliography 
 Ancient Egyptian Coregencies (Oriental Institute Chicago, 1977) 
 United with Eternity (Chicago, 1980) 
 The Penguin Guide to Ancient Egypt (London, 1983; revised 1996) 
 The Road to Kadesh (Chicago, 1985; revised 1990)
 The Boundary Stelae of Akhenaten (1993) 
 Texts from the Amarna Period (Atlanta, 1995; revised 1998)

References

1945 births
2000 deaths
20th-century American historians
20th-century American male writers
American Egyptologists
People from White Plains, New York
Saint Anselm College alumni
American male non-fiction writers